Swithland was a railway station which was constructed on the Great Central Main Line between Rothley and Quorn and Woodhouse. The station was due to open in March 1899 but was never completed although the line opened as planned in March 1899. The line through the station site was closed in May 1969. The line through the station was reopened in 1990 as the Great Central Railway.

History
The original plans for the MS&LR's London Extension had a station situated at Swithland instead of Rothley, although Rothley was much the larger village of the two, and only slightly further from the line. Local pressure, much of it spearheaded by Frederick Merttens, Lord of Rothley Manor, forced a change in the plans and the proposed site changed to Rothley; however, this did not mean that Swithland station was abandoned. The railway company had visions of turning the area into a tourist spot and the construction of Swithland station was commenced anyway. It would have consisted of an island platform of the standard design that became typical of the line, here the less common "embankment" type reached from a roadway (the Swithland-Rothley road) that passed beneath the line, similar to East Leake. In the event, these plans were thwarted, reportedly at a fairly advanced stage, and work stopped. Since it was barely a mile away to the south, Rothley station was deemed adequate to serve the area.

It has been difficult to determine just how much of Swithland station was actually built. The bricked up station entrance below and between the twin bridges over the Swithland-Rothley road can still be seen to this day; one of the many excellent photographs taken by the Leicester photographer S.W.A. Newton of the line's construction clearly shows the view looking up the stairway towards the platform. The mystery surrounds the platform itself - several sources appear to confirm that the platform was completed, together with at least some of the buildings, but it has so far not been possible to substantiate this for certain. What is known is that anything that was built lasted only a short time, though the main running lines continued to veer round the platform's site throughout the operating history of the line.

See also
Swithland Sidings
Swithland Reservoir
Swithland Viaduct

References

Unbuilt railway stations in the United Kingdom